Tom Grabham (born 20 June 1991) is a Welsh rugby union player. A wing or scrum-half, he plays rugby for the Scarlets having previously played for Bridgend RFC.

References

External links
 Ospreys profile

Welsh rugby union players
Ospreys (rugby union) players
Bridgend RFC players
1991 births
Living people
Rugby union players from Bridgend
Scarlets players
Rugby union wings